The PZL Krosno KR-03 Puchatek is a Polish mid-wing, T-tailed, two-seats-in-tandem, glider that was designed by Jerzy Krawczyk and Eugeniusz Pelczar and produced by PZL Krosno, first flying in 1985.

Design and development
The KR-03 was designed as an ab initio training glider. The name Puchatek is Polish translation of Pooh Bear.

The aircraft is made from aluminium with some parts covered in doped aircraft fabric covering. Its  span wing employs a Wortmann FX S-02-158 airfoil. The wing features top and bottom Schempp-Hirth-style dive brakes. The landing gear consists of an oleo-pneumatic sprung, non-retractable main wheel, a tail wheel and a rubber sprung nose skid.

The aircraft was type certified in the United States on 6 August 1991, with Barry Aviation of Edgewater, Volusia County, Florida as the US certificate holder.

Operational history
In 1993, a few examples were put into service with the Australian Air Force Cadets (AAFC), totalling to three as of 2012. They are currently assigned to 2 Wing AAFC. They are still in service as of 2014.

As of August 2011 there were 16 KR-03As registered in the United States with the Federal Aviation Administration and in August 2022 there were 10 KR-03As registered.

Variants
KR-03A
Main production version.

Specifications (KR-03A)

See also

References

External links

1980s Polish sailplanes
PZL aircraft
Aircraft first flown in 1985